John Alcock may refer to:

John Alcock (bishop) (c. 1430–1500), English churchman
John Alcock (priest), Dean of Ferns, 1747–1769
John Alcock (organist) (1715–1806), English organist and composer
John Alcock (Archdeacon of Raphoe) (1733–1817), Irish Anglican priest
John Alcock (organist, born 1740) (1740–1791), English organist and composer. Son of John Alcock (1715–1806)
John Forster Alcock (1841–1910), English sportsman and football organiser
John Alcock (Archdeacon of Waterford) (1866–1807)
John Alcock (RAF officer) (1892–1919), British Royal Air Force officer. First non-stop transatlantic flight
John Alcock (behavioral ecologist) (born 1942), American author, professor at Arizona State University